Anarchism in Bulgaria first appeared in the 1860s, within the national movement seeking independence from the Ottoman Empire, strongly influenced by the Russian revolutionary movement. Anarchism established itself as a distinct political movement at the end of the 19th century. It developed further in the 20th century, so much so that Bulgaria was one of the few countries in Eastern Europe where the organized anarchist movement enjoyed a real establishment throughout the country, until the seizure of power by the Bulgarian Communist Party. Under the People's Republic of Bulgaria, the anarchist movement survived underground, but was the victim of severe repression. From 1989, anarchism has been freely reconstituted.

History
Although some elements of anarchist teaching can be found in the sources of medieval Bogomilism, the beginning of the organized anarchist protests in Bulgaria is generally considered to be Spiro Gulabchev's "siromakhomilstvo" movement, inspired by populism and Russian nihilism. Hristo Botev had friends among Russian anarchists, the most important of which was Sergei Nechayev, and was strongly influenced by their teachings. 

During the April Uprising of 1876, Georgi Benkovski led guerrillas in the capture of Panagyurishte and ran the city as a commune, influenced by the Paris Commune. All cattle were brought under common ownership, food was handed out for free and money was abolished, while non-essential goods were distributed by a system of labour vouchers. But the implementation of a truly self-managed economy was halted after 10 days, when the Ottoman Empire re-captured the city from the Bulgarians. In the wake of the uprising's suppression, a number of Bulgarian anarchists, including Mile Popyordanov, took an active part in popular struggles against Ottoman rule and during the period of the principality of Bulgaria.

In April 1907, an anti-anarchist law was adopted, which resulted in the dissolution of legal anarchist groups, the banning of their written press and the arrest of certain militants.

The strongest period of anarchism in Bulgaria followed the end of World War I. The need for coordination of the many groups led to the founding, in June 1919, of the Federation of Anarchist-Communists in Bulgaria (FACB). Although it was only legal for a very short period of its existence, the organization held regular congresses, published printed publications and more. 

After the 1923 Bulgarian coup d'état, the anarchists entered into a direct confrontation with the authorities. They thus partook in the September Uprising, alongside the Bulgarian Communist Party and the Bulgarian Agrarian National Union, forming their own anarchist fighting groups. The libertarian movement was subsequently the target of political persecution by the new regime.

After the 1944 Bulgarian coup d'état, the FACB could once again act legally on the political scene and began active propaganda among the population. At the beginning of 1946, the new communist authorities began to indiscriminately persecute the anarchists, this vast repression led to the destruction of the anarchist movement organized in the country until 1989. According to State Security, the various anarcho-communist, anarcho-syndicalist and other libertarian organizations had 2,917 members at the time of their liquidation.

In 1990, the FACB was re-established under the name Federation of Anarchists in Bulgaria (FAB). Other anarchist or anarchist-like organizations, such as the informal AnarchoResistance group formed in 2001, have also been established. In 2019, the Autonomous Workers' Confederation was established, with sections in several Bulgarian cities.

See also 
 Boatmen of Thessaloniki
 Manol Vassev

References

Bibliography

External links 
 Анархопортал of the Federation of Anarchists in Bulgaria
 Официален уебсайт of the informal AnarchoResistance Group 
 Автономна of the Autonomous Workers' Confederation

 
Anarchism
Bulgaria